Oruchinga Refugee Settlement is a refugee camp in Isingiro District in Southern Uganda.

History 
Oruchinga Refugee Settlement was started in 1959 as a transit camp for refugees of Rwandese origin who were affected by tribal clashes in Rwanda.

Population 
The Oruchinga refugee settlement is presently hosting more than 6,800 refugees from Burundi, DRC (Democratic Republic of Congo) and Rwanda.

According to the current statistics the settlement is not receiving new refugees, apart from family reunification, referrals, and protection cases.

Economic activities 
According to the UNDP in 2018, a number of refugees in Oruchinga Refugee Settlement were engaged in greenhouse farming.

The Oruchinga refugee settlement hosts a number of education facilities such as Kayenje Primary School and Kajaho Primary School.

Social Services

References

Refugee camps in Uganda
Isingiro District
Populated places in Western Region, Uganda